Georg Faehlmann ( in Vladivostok, Russian Empire – 8 March 1975 in Bad Schwartau, West Germany) was an Estonian sailor who competed in the 1928 Summer Olympics.

In 1928 he was a crew member of the Estonian boat Tutti V which won the bronze medal in the 6 metre class. His younger brother Andreas was also a crew member.

His great-granduncle was a notable Estonian philologist and physician Friedrich Robert Faehlmann.

References

External links
profile

1895 births
1975 deaths
Estonian male sailors (sport)
Olympic sailors of Estonia
Sailors at the 1928 Summer Olympics – 6 Metre
Olympic bronze medalists for Estonia
Olympic medalists in sailing
Sportspeople from Vladivostok
Medalists at the 1928 Summer Olympics
Estonian emigrants to Germany